Vincent Jerome Esch,  (20 July 1876 – 9 December 1950) was a British architect who worked in India. He is regarded as a pioneer of the Indo-Sarcenic architectural style, which developed during the British rule in the Indian subcontinent.

Born in London, he moved to India in 1898, and was appointed assistant engineer on the Bengal Nagpur Railway before setting himself up as an architect in Calcutta. He was later appointed as the assistant to William Emerson, who had been chosen to design the monumental Victoria Memorial Hall in Calcutta. Esch was given the role of Superintending Architect and made major contributions to the design of the building.

In 1914, he was invited to Hyderabad by the Nizam, to design some major public buildings. He designed the Kacheguda railway station, the High Court, the City College, and the Osmania General Hospital in Hyderabad. He was in Hyderabad until 1921, then returned to Calcutta. He later returned to England, and died in 1950.

Early life and background 
He was born the son of C.A. Bernard Esch, a merchant banker of Blackheath, London and educated at Mount St Mary's College. He then trained as an architect in London.

Career

Early career 

He moved out to India in 1898 and was appointed assistant engineer on the Bengal Nagpur Railway before setting himself up as a architect in Calcutta (now Kolkata). After designing the temporary exhibition building for the Delhi Durbar of 1903, he was employed as an assistant by Sir William Emerson, who had been chosen to design the monumental Victoria Memorial Hall in Calcutta. Esch was given the role of Superintending Architect and made major contributions to the design of the building.

He had also won a competition to design the Bengal Club building at Chowringhee and the Bengal-Nagpur Railway head office building at Garden Reach.

Career in Hyderabad 
In 1914 Esch was retained by Osman Ali Khan, the Nizam of Hyderabad to help redevelop the city after serious flood damage. He designed numerous public buildings including the Kachiguda railway station (1914), the High Court (1916), the City College (1917–20), and the large Osmania General Hospital (1918–21). The latter is now threatened with demolition.

Later career 
Esch enjoyed 25 years of success as an architect in Calcutta, where he became a proponent of the Indo-Saracenic style, a fusion of classical and Islamic styles. In 1922 he was made CVO.

Return to England and death 
He later returned to England and died in Surrey in late 1950.

Personal life 
He had married Olive Edward in 1923 and had  one son and one daughter.

References

1876 births
1950 deaths
Esch
Commanders of the Royal Victorian Order
British people in colonial India
People educated at Mount St Mary's College
Architects in British India